Heredia is a district in the Heredia canton of Heredia province, Costa Rica. As the seat of the municipality of Heredia canton, it is awarded the status of city, and by virtue of being the city of the first canton, it is the Province Capital of Heredia province as well. It is 10 kilometers to the north of the country's capital, San José.

The city is home to one of the largest colleges in Costa Rica, the National University of Costa Rica, which accepts many international students.

History 

Prior to its founding, the area around Heredia was inhabited by the native tribe that is known as the Huetares, who were commanded at the coming of the Spanish by the Cacique Garabito. In 1706 settlers from Cartago, set up a small church at a place they called "Alvirilla", which soon became more populated. Between 1716 and 1717 the settlers moved their village to the north, to a place the indigenous people called Cubujuquí. In 1736 Heredia was deemed sufficiently large to be granted its own parish, and the first incarnation of the Iglesia de la Inmaculada was built to serve as its parish church. In 1751, the Bishop of Nicaragua and Costa Rica, Monseñor Pedro Agustín Morel de Santa Cruz supervised the founding of the first school in Heredia, which was run by the church. This school is now known as the Liceo de Heredia. In 1763 the town was promoted to the status of Villa; it was later renamed Heredia in honor of the President of the Real Audiencia of Guatemala who had conferred the status, don Alonso Fernández de Heredia.  During the 18th century the area around Heredia was developed, with the founding Barva and other towns. On 31 October 1796, Padre Felix de Alvarado laid the foundation stone for the rebuilding of the Iglesia de la Inmaculada. The Municipality of Heredia was founded on 19 May 1812, and in 1824, Heredia was promoted to city by Juan Mora Fernández. The 1848 constitution made Heredia the capital of Heredia Province, promoted it to cantón, and assigned it seven parishes.

Geography
Heredia has an area of  km² and an elevation of  metres.

Overview
Heredia is located 11km north of San José and is part of the Greater Metropolitan Area.

Demographics 

For the 2011 census, Heredia had a population of  inhabitants.

Transportation

Road transportation 
The district is covered by the following road routes:
 National Route 3
 National Route 5
 National Route 112
 National Route 113
 National Route 126
 National Route 171

Rail transportation 
The Interurbano Line operated by Incofer goes through this district. The rebuilt and national heritage Heredia railway station is a staffed station in the south of the district.

Sports
The city's football club is Herediano, who have won the league title 28 times. They play their home games at the Estadio Eladio Rosabal Cordero.

Sister cities
 Marietta (Georgia, USA)
 Richfield (Minnesota, USA)
Ariel (Judea and Samaria)

Notable people
Óscar Arias - President of Costa Rica from 1986 to 1990 and from 2006 to 2010, and winner of the Nobel Peace Prize in 1987.
Alfredo González Flores - President of Costa Rica from 1914 to 1917. His home, the House of Culture-Alfredo Gonzales Flores, was declared a National Monument in November 1974.
Fernando Baudrit Solera - former Dean of the College of Law at the University of Costa Rica and public jurist.
Marvin Angulo - Costa Rican professional footballer who currently plays for Deportivo Saprissa.
Anthony Contreras - footballer who plays as a forward for AD Guanacasteca, on loan from Herediano.
Carlos Villegas - winger for club Deportivo Saprissa.
Manfred Ugalde - footballer for Twente on loan from Belgian First Division B club Lommel.
Jewison Bennette - professional footballer who plays as a left winger for Herediano and the Costa Rica national team.
Nathalia Alfaro - beach volleyball player from Costa Rica, who played in the Swatch FIVB World Tour 2005.
Paulo Wanchope - Former Costa Rica national football team player and manager.

Climate
Very warm year-round, the temperatures are tempered by the amount of cloud cover that affects the area. Rainfall is spread throughout the year, but the rainiest period is May to October. The climate is relatively mild throughout the year.

See also
 Iglesia de la Inmaculada

References

External links

Districts of Heredia Province
Populated places in Heredia Province
Greater Metropolitan Area (Costa Rica)
Former national capitals
Populated places established in the 1570s